Welcome to Our World is the debut studio album by American hip hop duo Timbaland & Magoo. It was released on November 11, 1997 through Blackground Entertainment and Atlantic Records. Production was entirely handled by Timbaland himself, except for the song "Joy", which was produced with Smoke E. Digglera. It features guest appearances from Playa, Missy "Misdemeanor" Elliott, Aaliyah, Ginuwine, Shaunta Montgomery, Love Jon, Buddha Brother, Big B and DJ Law.

The album peaked at number 33 on the US Billboard 200 albums chart. It was certified Platinum by the Recording Industry Association of America on May 12, 1998 for selling over a million copies. It spawned three singles: the official singles "Up Jumps da Boogie" and "Clock Strikes", and the promotional single "Luv 2 Luv Ya". Its lead single, "Up Jumps da Boogie", was certified Gold by the RIAA on August 26, 1997. 

In August 2021, Blackground rebranded as Blackground 2.0, with Barry Hankerson remaining as founder. Blackground 2.0 signed a distribution deal with Empire Distribution, which will re-release the label's catalogue onto digital download sites and streaming services.  Welcome To Our World was rereleased on August 27, 2021.

Track listing

Sample credits
Track 1 contains a sample of "The Rain (Supa Dupa Fly)" by Melissa "Missy" Elliott
Track 14 contains a sample of the Knight Rider theme by Glen A. Larson and Stu Phillips

Charts

Certifications

References

External links

Timbaland albums
1997 debut albums
Magoo (rapper) albums
Albums produced by Timbaland